Federico Andrés Martínez Berroa (born 28 February 1996) is a Uruguayan professional footballer who plays for Liga MX Club León. Mainly a winger, he can also play as a forward.

Club career
Born in Montevideo, Martínez joined Liverpool Montevideo's youth setup at the age of 12, after playing for Zorzal Baby Fútbol Club and Club Las Flores Baby Fútbol. He made his first team – and Primera División – debut on 13 February 2016, starting in a 0–1 away loss against Plaza Colonia.

Martínez only established himself as a starter in the 2017 campaign, and scored his first senior goal on 26 August of that year, netting the opener in a 1–2 loss at Peñarol. On 26 November, he scored a brace in a 5–0 home routing of Danubio.

On 4 May 2019, Martínez scored a hat-trick in a 4–0 away win over Boston River. The following 30 January, he moved abroad and joined Argentine Primera División side Rosario Central on loan, after the club bought 30% of his economic rights for a rumoured fee of US$750,000.

In September 2020, after only two matches for Central, Martínez moved to Independiente on loan until the following 31 January, with a buyout option. After featuring rarely, he rescinded his contract with the Rojo on 19 February 2021 and returned to his parent club.

International career
Martínez is a former Uruguay youth international. He was part of under-22 squad which finished fourth at 2019 Pan American Games.

On 29 August 2021, Martínez received maiden call-up to senior team for FIFA World Cup qualifiers.

Career statistics

Club

International

References

External links
 
 

1996 births
Living people
Uruguayan footballers
Uruguayan expatriate footballers
Footballers from Montevideo
Association football forwards
Uruguay youth international footballers
Uruguayan Primera División players
Argentine Primera División players
Liverpool F.C. (Montevideo) players
Rosario Central footballers
Club Atlético Independiente footballers
Club León footballers
Club Nacional de Football players
Uruguayan expatriate sportspeople in Argentina
Uruguayan expatriate sportspeople in Mexico
Expatriate footballers in Argentina
Expatriate footballers in Mexico